Eilean Mullagrach is an island in the Summer Isles of Scotland. It is located in Highland council area, in the northwestern part of the country, 800 km northwest of the capital London. It is the most northerly of the Summer Isles. Its area is 29 hectares. It is 150 feet high.

References

Summer Isles
Uninhabited islands of Highland (council area)